Pobedobesie is a pejorative term used to describe the "hyperbolic celebrations" of Victory Day in Russia. This has been dubbed the Victory Cult.

Recently the term has been extended to refer to the weaponization of the legacy of World War II to justify Russia's aggressive policies and an increase of militarism, using the Soviet victory over Nazi Germany for propaganda purposes.

Background 

The main state holiday of the Soviet Union was 7 November, the day of the October Revolution, with 9 May not being a holiday between 1948 and 1965. With the Brezhnev era, Victory Day became an important holiday partially to help legitimize the ailing Soviet system. Over time the Soviet victory in World War II replaced the October Revolution as the "story at the heart" of the Soviet Union, remaining the unifying story also in chaotic post-Soviet Russia.

Propaganda and Putin 

Victory Day has become an even more central holiday under Russian president Vladimir Putin, who according to critics has nurtured a "cult" of the Great Patriotic War". Russia under Putin has also used the language of Soviet victory of Nazi Germany to justify Russian aggression towards Ukraine. The Great Patriotic War has, according to Shaun Walker of the Guardian, gradually become the "centrepiece of Vladimir Putin's concept of Russian identity over his two decades in charge". Russian propaganda expert and historian Ian Garner, states that Putin has reconstructed the Soviet "cult of the Great Patriotic War" in a "manner that has all the hallmarks of a religion", and that "the state's cult of the Second World War – has been incorporated into Orthodox Christianity, and vice versa". Julia Davis, a Russian media monitor, describes pobedobesie as "an unhealthy obsession with military might and past victories".

In a speech on Victory Day in 2000, shortly after becoming president, Putin addressed a group of veterans, stating: "Through you, we got used to being winners. This entered our blood. It was not just responsible for military victories, but will also help our generation in peaceful times, help us to build a strong and flourishing country."

According to Euromaidan Press pobedobesie has become "one of the most important parts of the propaganda" in Putin's Russia.

Noted elements identified with pobedobesie include Russian citizens "adding a papier maché turret to their child's pushchair to make it look like a tank, or daubing 'To Berlin' on their cars." In recent years, slogans such as "We can do it again" has become popular.

See also 
 Cathedral of the Armed Forces
 Russian allegations of fascism against Ukraine

References 

History of Russia (1991–present)
Propaganda in the Soviet Union
Nostalgia for the Soviet Union
Neo-Sovietism
Propaganda in Russia
Victory days
Russian nationalism
Vladimir Putin
Veterans' affairs in Russia
War and politics
21st-century military history of Russia
Civil–military relations
Moscow Victory Day Parades
Russian political phrases
Propaganda in Russia related to the 2022 Russian invasion of Ukraine